Kiniatiliops is a genus of parasitic flies in the family Tachinidae.

Species
Kiniatiliops nigrapex (Mesnil, 1952)
Kiniatiliops trispina Mesnil, 1959

References

Diptera of Africa
Exoristinae
Tachinidae genera